Events from the year 1951 in France.

Incumbents
President: Vincent Auriol 
President of the Council of Ministers: 
 until 10 March: René Pleven
 10 March-11 August: Henri Queuille
 starting 11 August: René Pleven

Events
13 January – Battle of Vĩnh Yên begins in Vietnam.
17 January – Battle of Vĩnh Yên ends in decisive defeat for the Việt Minh forces.
23 March – Battle of Mạo Khê begins.
28 March – Battle of Mạo Khê ends in the defeat of Việt Minh forces.
April – Magazine Cahiers du cinéma is first published.
18 April – Treaty of Paris adopted, establishing European Coal and Steel Community.
17 June – Legislative Election is held to elect the second National Assembly of the Fourth Republic.
11 August – René Pleven becomes Prime Minister of France.
10 November – Battle of Hòa Bình begins.
December – Engagements in the Battle of Hòa Bình continue.

Sport
The 1951 French rugby league tour of Australia and New Zealand is conducted.
4 July – Tour de France begins.
29 July – Tour de France ends, won by Hugo Koblet of Switzerland.

Births
10 January – Nicolas Philibert, film director and actor
13 January – Bernard Loiseau, chef (died 2003)
6 February – Jacques Villeret, actor (died 2005)
11 October – Jean-Jacques Goldman, singer and songwriter
6 November – Alain Etchegoyen, philosopher and novelist (died 2007)

Deaths
7 January – René Guénon, orientalist and philosopher (born 1886)
26 January – Henri Bard, international soccer player (born 1892)
19 February – André Gide, author and winner of Nobel Prize in literature in 1947 (born 1869)
2 June – Émile Chartier, philosopher, journalist and pacifist (born 1868)
21 June – Gustave Sandras, artistic gymnast (born 1872)
23 July – Philippe Pétain, Marshal of France, later Chief of State of Vichy France (born 1856)

See also
 List of French films of 1951

References

1950s in France